Marijan Čerček (born 3 February 1949 in Zagreb, SFR Yugoslavia) is a former Croatian football player. He scored the 1-0 goal in the first leg of the Inter-Cities Fairs Cup against Leeds United

International career
He made his debut for Yugoslavia in a September 1969 friendly match against the Soviet Union, it remained his sole international appearance.

Honours
Dinamo Zagreb
Inter-Cities Fairs Cup: 1966–67
Yugoslav Football Cup: 1968–69

References

External links
 
 Profile at Serbian federation official site
  Profile at Weltfussball

1949 births
Living people
Footballers from Zagreb
Association football midfielders
Yugoslav footballers
Yugoslavia international footballers
GNK Dinamo Zagreb players
NK Zagreb players
Yugoslav First League players
Yugoslav Second League players